Robert S. Gibbons (born June 22, 1958) is an American economist, currently the Sloan Distinguished Professor of Management at Massachusetts Institute of Technology. He launched the Working Group on Organizational Economics at the National Bureau of Economic Research in 2002, and was its director until 2022.

Education
Ph. D. (Decision Sciences), Stanford Graduate School of Business, September 1985. 
M. Phil. (Economics, with honours), Cambridge University, June 1981.
A. B. (Applied Mathematics, magna cum laude), Harvard University, June 1980.

Selected publications 

Gibbons, Robert (1992) Game Theory for Applied Economists, Princeton University Press  (The non US version is A Primer in Game Theory)

References

Living people
MIT Sloan School of Management faculty
21st-century American economists
Harvard School of Engineering and Applied Sciences alumni
Alumni of the University of Cambridge
Stanford Graduate School of Business alumni
1958 births
Fellows of the Econometric Society